Bredon School, formerly Pull Court, is a private school in Bushley, Worcestershire, England. The house was built for the Reverend Canon E. C. Dowdeswell by Edward Blore between 1831 and 1839. The site is much older and Blore's house replaced an earlier mansion. The Dowdeswells had been prominent in local and national politics since the 18th century, with many serving as members of Parliament. The family sold the house in 1934 to the parents of Richard Seaman, a prominent pre-war racing driver, who lived there until his death in a crash in the 1939 Belgian Grand Prix. In 1962, the court became a school, Bredon School, founded by Lt-Col Tony Sharp and Hugh Jarrett, for the education of boys who had failed the Common Entrance Examination. It remains a specialist school with a focus on educating children with specific learning difficulties, such as dyslexia and dyspraxia.

History
The political fortunes of the Dowdeswell family were established by Richard Dowdeswell (-1673). His father, a successful lawyer, had bought Pull Court, and much other property in Worcestershire and neighboring Gloucestershire, in the early 17th century. A prominent Royalist during the English Civil War, Richard Dowdeswell was returned as Member of Parliament for Tewkesbury in the Convention Parliament of 1660. His grandson, another Richard (-1711), served as member for the same seat until the early 18th century. A later descendent, William Dowdeswell (1721-1775), served as Chancellor of the Exchequer in 1765 under the Marquess of Rockingham. In the 19th century, the Rev. Canon E. C. Dowdeswell, who had sought preference in the church rather than politics, commissioned Edward Blore to build a new mansion at Pull, near the site of the Dowdeswell ancestral home.

The Court was sold by the Dowdeswell family in the 1930s and was bought by the parents of Richard Seaman. Seaman, a racing driver, was killed in the 1939 Belgian Grand Prix. In 1962, Bredon School was established on the estate.

Architecture and  description
Alan Brooks and Nikolaus Pevsner, in their Worcestershire volume of the Buildings of England series, describe Pull Court as "large, competent [and] highly monumental". Mark Girouard, in his study The Victorian Country House, is less impressed, calling Blore's entrance frontage "weedily symmetrical". The main construction material is limestone ashlar, although the north, entrance, front is faced with Lias stone. An archway leads into an enclosed courtyard, with the facing entrance frontage flanked by two wings. The southern, garden frontage is of five bays. A service court lies to the east. The interior decoration is mainly Jacobethan in style.

The court is a Grade II* listed building. The Stable Cottage, another estate building, The Stalls, and a pair of Lodge cottages are all listed Grade II. Tradition ascribes the landscaping of the park around the court to Capability Brown but there is no documentary evidence which supports the claim.

Bredon School
Bredon School is a mixed-entry independent school for children aged 7–18 years, with a specialism in the education of children with the specific learning difficulties of dyslexia and dyscalculia.

Notes

References

Sources

External links
Aerial footage of Pull Court by Aerial Film and Photo.com

Grade II* listed buildings in Worcestershire
Country houses in Worcestershire
Jacobethan architecture
Edward Blore buildings
Houses completed in 1839
Grade II* listed houses
Private schools in Worcestershire
Boarding schools in Worcestershire
Educational institutions established in 1962
1962 establishments in England